Mario Stecher (born 17 July 1977, in Eisenerz) is an Austrian former Nordic combined skier. Competing in six Winter Olympics, he won three medals in the 4 x 5 km team event with two golds (2006, 2010) and a bronze (2002). Stecher's best individual finish was fifth in the 10 km individual normal hill event at Vancouver in 2010.

He won six medals at the FIS Nordic World Ski Championships with two gold, three silvers (7.5 km sprint: 1999, 4 x 5 km team: 2001) and a bronze (4 x 5 km team: 1997).

Stecher has a total of nine World Cup victories since 1994, including the Nordic combined event at the Holmenkollen ski festival that same year. Being 16 years old, he was the youngest winner on the Holmenkollen. - On February 27, 2015, he announced his retirement, after he wasn't nominated by the Austrian Ski Federation to compete in the FIS Nordic Skiing World Championships 2015 in Falun.

He is married to Carina Raich since 2008.

External links

Holmenkollen winners since 1892 – click Vinnere for downloadable pdf file 
 

1977 births
Austrian male Nordic combined skiers
Holmenkollen Ski Festival winners
Living people
Nordic combined skiers at the 1994 Winter Olympics
Nordic combined skiers at the 1998 Winter Olympics
Nordic combined skiers at the 2002 Winter Olympics
Nordic combined skiers at the 2006 Winter Olympics
Nordic combined skiers at the 2010 Winter Olympics
Nordic combined skiers at the 2014 Winter Olympics
Nordic combined Grand Prix winners
Olympic gold medalists for Austria
Olympic bronze medalists for Austria
Olympic Nordic combined skiers of Austria
Olympic medalists in Nordic combined
FIS Nordic World Ski Championships medalists in Nordic combined
Medalists at the 2010 Winter Olympics
Medalists at the 2006 Winter Olympics
Medalists at the 2002 Winter Olympics
Medalists at the 2014 Winter Olympics
People from Leoben District
Sportspeople from Styria